João Pedro Francisco da Silva (born 29 January 1994) is a Brazilian handball player for Dinamo București and the Brazil national team.

Honours
Benfica
Portuguese Cup: 2017–18
Portuguese Super Cup: 2018
Individual
2017 Four Nations Tournament: MVP
2022 South and Central American Men's Handball Championship: Best centre back

References

1994 births
Living people
Brazilian male handball players
People from Nova Iguaçu
Handball players at the 2016 Summer Olympics
Olympic handball players of Brazil
Expatriate handball players
Brazilian expatriate sportspeople in France
Brazilian expatriate sportspeople in Spain
Brazilian expatriate sportspeople in Portugal
Brazilian expatriate sportspeople in Romania
Liga ASOBAL players
CB Ademar León players
S.L. Benfica handball players
CSA Steaua București (handball) players
CS Dinamo București (men's handball) players
Pan American Games medalists in handball
Pan American Games bronze medalists for Brazil
Handball players at the 2019 Pan American Games
Medalists at the 2019 Pan American Games
Handball players at the 2020 Summer Olympics
Sportspeople from Rio de Janeiro (state)